Spartanburg High School  is the public high school in Spartanburg, South Carolina. It is part of Spartanburg County School District No. 7.

The current principal is Vance Jones, a former assistant principal at the school.

The district includes most of Spartanburg, as well as Ben Avon, Drayton, Whitney, most of Camp Croft, and portions of Arkwright, Hilltop, and Saxon.

History

Spartanburg High School began in 1897 when the Board of Trustees had erected the building known as the Converse Street High School. The faculty numbered 10 and the student body was less than 200.

In 1921 the Dean Street wing was added and the school was renamed in honor of Dr. Frank Evans, superintendent, and from 1922 to 1959, the high school was housed in the Frank Evans High School building on Dean Street. The building became a junior high school in 1959 when the new Spartanburg High School was built in its current location.

The school's football team until 1970 were known as Crimson Tide, and their colors were red and white. The basketball team prior to 1970 were known as the Red Birds.

In 1970, integration of public schools was forced by the federal courts, and Carver High School, the city's black high school, closed and was merged with Spartanburg High School, which chose a new team name, the Vikings, and new colors, blue and gold. The Carver campus was changed to a junior high school. A construction program at Spartanburg High School was begun immediately, and in the fall of 1974 D-wing was completed, adding 41 new classrooms, a new library-media center, and a new student center. In addition to D-wing, the A, B, and C wings were completely renovated and air-conditioned.

Since 1996, the campus has undergone many needed renovations. The athletic department facilities were remodeled and expanded to accommodate a growing program. E-wing houses facilities for JROTC, state-of-the-art information technology equipment classrooms, acoustically designed practice rooms, rehearsal rooms for chorus and orchestra, and a space for the band. An enclosed hallway links E-wing with the front lobby. Renovations were completed in 1999 for the science department A-wing, a new front entrance with an atrium, and a reconfigured front parking lot. In the fall of 2005, a state-of-the-art weight room and multi-purpose room was completed in the athletic department.

The New Spartanburg High School

In 2016, the residents of District 7 endorsed a bond measure to fulfill a number of projects designed to bring about significant advances for the school system. Among those was construction of the new Spartanburg High School at 2250 East Main Street, the former site of the Lan-Yair Country Club.

Constructed for a capacity of 2,500 students, the 189-acre site includes a 1,000-seat Fine Arts Center, a comprehensive athletic complex, a 7,500-seat athletic stadium, and a 2,500-seat arena.

Fine arts, health and wellness, student activity and athletic facilities support performances and athletic events.

An outdoor environmental classroom, designed with input and guidance from students, faculty, a renowned naturalist, and community partners was incorporated into the campus design along with walking trails, ponds, functional courtyards, and plazas.

The new Spartanburg High School is the ninth high school nationwide – and the only in South Carolina – to achieve Two Green Globes. This certification is awarded by the Green Building Initiative.

Notable alumni
Julie Story Byerley, Pediatrician and Vice Dean for Education for the University of North Carolina at Chapel Hill School of Medicine 
Stephen Davis, football player
Art Fowler (1922–2007), pitcher and pitching coach in Major League Baseball
Steve Fuller, football player
Trey Gowdy, Republican U.S. Congressman representing  from 2011 to 2019
T. J. Johnston, Anglican bishop
Bud Moore, NASCAR team owner and member of the NASCAR Hall of Fame
Kris Neely, artist and educator 
Trip Payne, puzzlemaker
Anthony Simmons, football player
Laura Story, contemporary Christian music singer-songwriter
General William Westmoreland, commanding general during the Vietnam War
Wayne Tolleson, former baseball player

References

External links
Spartanburg High School
Spartanburg County School District No. 7

Public high schools in South Carolina
Schools in Spartanburg County, South Carolina
Buildings and structures in Spartanburg, South Carolina